'What You Give Is What You Get is the second and final studio album by Australian pop-rock group Uncanny X-Men. Uncanny X-Men signed to CBS Records in May 1986 and released What You Give Is What You Get in October 1986. The album was certified gold by the end of 1986.

Track listing

Charts

Certifications

Personnel 
 John Kirk – bass
 Craig Waugh – drums
 Chris Corr – engineer
 Brett Kingman  – guitar
 Joey Amenta – guitar
 Brian Mannix – vocals

References 

1986 albums
CBS Records albums
Uncanny X-Men (band) albums